Robert Sanderson may refer to:
Robert Thomas Sanderson (1912–1989), chemist who developed the idea of electronegativity equalization
Robert Sanderson (Nova Scotia) (1696 – after 1761), merchant and politician of Nova Scotia
Robert Sanderson (theologian) (1587–1663), English theologian and casuist
Robert Sanderson (MP), Member of House of Commons of England for West Looe 1588–1589
Robert B. Sanderson (1825–1887), American farmer and politician
 Robert Dewayne “Sande” Sanderson, off-duty police officer murdered by anti-abortion bomber Eric Robert Rudolph in the U.S. in 1998
 Robert G. Sanderson (1920–2012), President Emeritus of the National Association of the Deaf (U.S.)